The Annaberger Kät (commonly called the Kät, pronounced "Kett") is the largest folk festival in the Ore Mountains and takes place annually for 14 days after Pentecost in the town of Annaberg-Buchholz in East Germany. It is one of the folk festivals in Germany, at which over 100 showmen perform their acts.

The Kät is known well outside the region and is one of the oldest folk festivals in Germany, having begun in 1520. It attracts over 150,000 visitors annually. The emphasis of the festival is more on shows and fairground rides rather than on food stalls and eating.

References

External links 
http://www.annaberg-buchholz.de - Official internet site of the town of Annaberg-Buchholz with information about the Kät 

Culture of the Ore Mountains
Annaberg-Buchholz
Folk festivals in Germany
Music festivals established in 1520
Festivals established in 1520
1520 establishments in the Holy Roman Empire